This is a list of the extreme points of Italy: the points that are farther north, south, east or west than any other location, as well as the highest and lowest points.

Latitude and longitude

 Northernmost point: Westliches Zwillingsköpfl, Predoi, Alto Adige at 
 Westernmost point: Rocca Bernauda, Bardonecchia, Piedmont at 
 Easternmost point: Capo d'Otranto, Otranto, Apulia at

Elevation
 Highest point: Monte Bianco, Courmayeur (4,807.5 m) at 
 Lowest point: Le Contane, Jolanda di Savoia (-3.44 m) at 
 Highest settlement: Trepalle, Livigno (2,209 m) at

Notes

See also
 Geography of Italy
 Extreme points of Earth

Geography of Italy
Italy
Lists of coordinates